Cantopop (a contraction of "Cantonese pop music") or HK-pop (short for "Hong Kong pop music") is a genre of pop music written in standard Chinese and sung in Cantonese. Cantopop is also used to refer to the cultural context of its production and consumption. The genre began in the 1970s and became associated with Hong Kong popular music from the middle of the decade. Cantopop then reached its height of popularity in the 1980s and 1990s before slowly declining in the 2000s and experiencing a slight revival in the 2010s. The term "Cantopop" itself was coined in 1978 after "Cantorock", a term first used in 1974. In the eighties Cantopop has reached its highest glory with fanbase and concerts from all over the world, especially from Macau, Mainland China, Taiwan, Singapore, Malaysia, South Korea, and Japan. This is even more obvious with the influx of songs from Hong Kong movies during the time.

Besides Western pop music, Cantopop is also influenced by other international genres, including jazz, rock and roll, R&B, disco, electronic and others. Cantopop songs are almost invariably performed in Cantonese. Boasting a multi-national fanbase in Southeast Asian nations such as Vietnam, Thailand, Singapore, Malaysia and Indonesia, as well as in East Asian regions of South Korea, Japan, Taiwan and the provinces of Guangdong and Guangxi in southeastern mainland China, Hong Kong, and occasionally Macau, remain the most significant hubs of the genre.

History

1920s to 1950s: Shanghai origins
Western-influenced music first came to China in the 1920s, specifically through Shanghai. Artists like Zhou Xuan acted in films and recorded popular songs.

In 1949 when the People's Republic of China was established by the Chinese Communist Party, one of the first actions taken by the government was to denounce pop music (specifically Western pop) as decadent music. Beginning in the 1950s, massive waves of immigrants fled Shanghai to destinations like North Point in Hong Kong. As a result, many first generation Cantopop artists and composers hail from Shanghai.

1960s: Cultural acceptance
By the 1960s, Cantonese music in Hong Kong was still limited largely to traditional Cantonese opera and comic renditions of western music. Tang Kee-chan, Cheng Kuan-min, and Tam Ping-man were among the earliest artists releasing Cantonese records.

The generation at the time preferred British and American exports. Western culture was at the time equated with education and sophistication, and Elvis Presley, Johnny Mathis and The Ladybirds were popular.

Conversely, those who did not prefer Cantonese music were not considered fashioned or educated.  and Chan Chung-chug were two popular Cantonese singers who specifically targeted the younger generation. Connie Chan Po-chu is generally considered to be Hong Kong's 657th teen idol, mostly due to her career longevity. Josephine Siao is also another artist of the era.

1970s: Beginning of the Golden Age (Rise of television and the modern industry)

Local bands mimicked British and American bands.  Two types of local Cantonese music appeared in the market nearly concurrently in 1973: one type cashed in on the popularity of TVB's drama series based on the more traditional lyrical styles. The other was more western style music largely from Polydor Hong Kong.  Notable singers from the era include Liza Wang and Paula Tsui. At the same time, television was fast becoming a household must-have that offered free entertainment to the public. For example, The Fatal Irony and Games Gamblers Play took the local music scene by storm as soon as they were broadcast on the radio and television.

Soap operas were needed to fill TV air time, and popular Cantonese songs became TV theme songs. Around 1971, Sandra Lang, a minor singer who had never sung Cantopop before, was invited to sing the first Cantonese TV theme song "A marriage of Laughter and Tears". This song was a collaboration between songwriters Yip Siu-dak and the legendary Joseph Koo. It was ground-breaking and topped local charts. Other groups that profited from TV promotion included the Four Golden Flowers.

Sam Hui is regarded by some to be the earliest Cantopop star. He was the lead singer of the band Lotus formed in the late 1960s, signed to Polydor in 1972. The song that made him famous was the theme song to Games Gamblers Play, also starring Hui.

The star of TV theme tunes was Roman Tam. Three of the most famous TV soap opera singers were Jenny Tseng, Liza Wang and Adam Cheng. The Wynners and George Lam also amassed a big fan base with their new style. Samuel Hui continued to dominate the charts and won the Centennial Best Sales Award in the first and second IFPI Gold Disc Presentations twice in a row in 1977 and 1978. Polydor became PolyGram in 1978.

It was at this time that the term Cantopop was first coined. The Billboard correspondent Hans Ebert, who had earlier coined the term Cantorock in 1974, noted a change in its style to something similar to British-American soft rock, therefore started to use the term Cantopop instead in 1978.

In 1974, as the theme song of The Fatal Irony was very successful, TVB sold to the mainland and other countries and Cantopop reached overseas audiences through drama series.

1980s: The Golden Age of Cantopop
During the 1980s, Cantopop soared to great heights with artists, producers and record companies working in harmony. Cantopop stars such as Jacky Cheung, Andy Lau, Anita Mui, Leslie Cheung, George Lam, Alan Tam, Sally Yeh, Priscilla Chan, Sandy Lam, and Danny Chan quickly became household names. The industry used Cantopop songs in TV dramas and movies, with some of the biggest soundtracks coming from films such as A Better Tomorrow. Sponsors and record companies became comfortable with the idea of lucrative contracts and million-dollar signings. There are also Japanese songs with Cantonese lyrics.

The most successful Chinese recording artist, "Queen of Mandarin songs" Teresa Teng also crossed over to Cantopop.  She achieved commercial success with her original Cantonese Hits under the Polygram Label in the early 1980s. Jenny Tseng was a notable addition from Macau.

In the 1980s, there came the second wave of "band fever" (the first wave came in the 1960–70s, which was much influenced by the global Beatlemania at that time. Young people thought that forming bands was fashionable. Many new bands emerged at that time, such as Samuel Hui's Lotus, The Wynners, and the Teddy Robin and the Playboys. However, the bands emerged in this first wave were just copying the western music style, mostly covering British and American rock songs, and prefer singing in English rather than Cantonese). Different from the first wave in the 60s, the "band fever" in the 80s did not show an obvious relationship with the global culture at the time being, but much related with the marketing strategy of the local record companies and mass media. Many independent bands and music groups were signed by big record companies, and this made a positive impact to the Hong Kong pop music world, as their works were highly original, with strong individuality, and they were all devoted to writing songs in local language, i.e. Cantonese. The subjects of their works were different from the mainstream (which was mostly love ballads). Politics and social life were popular subjects for the bands in their creation. The "band fever" also brought variety in musical style to the Hong Kong mainstream music world (which was almost monopolised by Pop-ballad for a long time). Styles like Rock, Metal, Pop-Rock, Folk, Neo-Romantic, Pop and some experimental styles (e.g. Cantorock) were introduced. Among them, Beyond and Tat Ming Pair gave the greatest impact to the Hong Kong music world. Some renowned bands and groups included: Beyond, Raidas, Tat Ming Pair, Tai Chi, Grasshopper, Little Tigers, Paradox, Blue Jeans, Echo, Wind & Cloud, Citybeat.

The second wave of "band fever" also brought a group of new music lovers to the Hong Kong mainstream music world. Most of them were the just-grew-up generation, or the music lovers of the western Avant-garde music, also the Euro-American Rock-band lovers. This contributed to a great change in the population and age distribution of the music listeners from the 70s. Record companies were laying ever more stress on the buying power of these young new customers. The second wave of "band fever" emerged from the mid 1980s (around 1984) and reached its climax in 1986–87. However the "band fever" cannot put for a long time. Along with the death of the legendary Wong Ka Kui, the leader and co-founder of Beyond, in 1993, and the disband-tide emerged in the early 90s (Tat Ming Pair disbanded in 1990), the "band fever" gradually faded away and totally got down in the early 1990s.

As Cantopop gained large followings in Chinese communities worldwide, Hong Kong entrepreneurs' ingenious use of the then new Laserdisc technology prompted yet another explosion in the market.

1990s: Four Heavenly Kings era
In the 1990s in Hong Kong, the "Four Heavenly Kings"—Jacky Cheung, Andy Lau, Aaron Kwok and Leon Lai—dominated music, and coverage in magazines, TV, advertisements and cinema.

The sovereignty handover created a culturally challenging atmosphere for the industry. Establishment of Basic Law and language ordinances made the adoption of Mandarin inevitable.

In 2019, Andy Lau spoke of his desire for a reunion of the Four Heavenly Kings in an interview with the press.

2000s: New era
At the turn of the century, Cantonese was still dominant in the domain of Chinese pop. The deaths of stars Leslie Cheung and Anita Mui in 2003 rocked the industry. A transitional phase also took place with many overseas-raised artists such as Nicholas Tse and Coco Lee gaining recognition. As a result, Cantopop is no longer restricted to Hong Kong, but has become part of a larger music movement.

In 2005 Cantopop began a new upswing. Major companies that drove much of the HK segment included Gold Typhoon Music Entertainment (EMI, Gold Label), Universal Music Group, East Asia Entertainment and Amusic and Emperor Entertainment Group. 

The decade was also dubbed a "People's singer" era, as most performers were frequently seen promoting publicly, contrasting the 1990s when previous era "big-name" singers seemed unapproachable.

A number of scandals struck some of the stars later in the decade. In 2008 the Edison Chen photo scandal involving Edison Chen and Twins singer Gillian Chung, among others, who were the subject of explicit photos uploaded online. The scandal occupied the front pages of the local press for a solid month, and also garnered the attention of international media. The scandal tarnished the image of the previously "squeaky-clean" Twins, and resulted in their going into hiatus in late June 2008, four months after Gillian was caught up in the scandal. Other events include the street fight between Gary Chaw and Justin Lo. In 2009, Jill Vidal and her singer boyfriend Kelvin Kwan were arrested in Tokyo on 24 February 2009 over allegations of marijuana possession. Kwan was released without charge after 32 days in jail, while Vidal later pleaded guilty in Tokyo court to heroin possession, and was sentenced to 2 years' imprisonment, suspended for 3 years.

2010s: Decline
Mandarin became more important as a result of fast growing culturally and economically in China, the influence of Cantonese became vulnerable. Nevertheless, in addition to the 7 million people of Hong Kong and Macau, the genre continues to enjoy popularity among a Cantonese-speaking audience of in excess of 100 million in southern China, plus 10 million Cantonese-speaking diaspora in Canada, Australia and the United States. In 2010, a proposal that Guangzhou Television station should increase its broadcast in Mandarin led to protests in Guangzhou. While the authorities relented, this event reflects attempts at marginalising Cantonese and the ascendency of Mandopop.

The first major award of the decade 09 JSG award was a highly controversial one with the ongoing HKRIA tax case. The case was reportedly solved in early 2012 though. In January 2012, the 11 JSG award was again controversial since one of the biggest awards, Record of the Year, was handed to Raymond Lam with his unpopular song "Chok".

2020s: Resurgence

Interest in Cantopop was renewed in the early 2020s in part due to the COVID-19 pandemic in Hong Kong, which led to border closures and restriction of travel. In addition to the 2019–2020 Hong Kong protests and the passing of the Hong Kong national security law in June 2020, the resurgence of Hong Kong pride had led many Cantonese natives to support local music artistes. The Cantopop boy group Mirror, which was formed through the ViuTV singing competition in Good Night Show - King Maker in 2018, skyrocketed in popularity during this time due to their distinctively local image. Media had described them as "the new kings of Cantopop" and a "Cantopop phenomenon."

In February 2021, Hong Kong's biggest television broadcaster, TVB, historically lifted its ban on four of Hong Kong's biggest record labels, opening the doors for non-TVB artistes to perform on the network. The move was described by local media as "reviving the Cantopop music industry."

Characteristics

Instruments and setups
Early Cantopop was developed from Cantonese opera music hybridised with Western pop. The musicians soon gave up traditional Chinese musical instruments like zheng and Erhu fiddle in favour of western style arrangements. Cantopop songs are usually sung by one singer, sometimes with a band, accompanied by piano, synthesizer, drum set and guitars. They are composed under verse-chorus form and are generally monophonic. Practically all early Cantopop songs feature a descending bassline.

Lyrics
Cantonese is a pitch sensitive tonal language. The word carries a different meaning when sung in a different relative pitch. Matching Cantonese lyrics to Western music was particularly difficult because the Western musical scale has 12 semitones.  Through the work of pioneers like Samuel Hui, James Wong and Jimmy Lo Kwok Jim, those that followed have more stock phrases for reference.

Tonal constraints have been blamed for the decline of Cantopop in the late 1990s, for source of creativity being "mined out". Its ramification includes interpretive constraint, where singers have less room for ad-lib change of pitch without sacrificing intelligibility. As a result, pitch change often encountered in western pop music becomes foreign to most of Hong Kong's singers.

Classical Chinese lyrics
The first type is the poetic lyrics written in literary or classical Wenyan Chinese. In the past, Cantopop maintained the Cantonese Opera tradition of matching the musical notes with tones of the language. Relatively few Cantopop songs use truly colloquial Cantonese terms, and fewer songs contain lyrics. Songs written in this style are usually reserved for TV shows about ancient China. Since the 1980s, increasing numbers of singers have departed from this tradition, though some big names like Roman Tam stayed true to traditional techniques.

Modern Chinese lyrics
The second type is less formal. The lyrics written in colloquial Cantonese make up the majority with compositions done in modern written Chinese. TV shows filmed under modern contexts will use songs written with these lyrics. Most songs share an over-riding characteristic, in which every last word of a phrase is rhymed.

The following is an example from the song "Impression" by Samuel Hui. The last word of every phrase ends with '–oeng'.

Covers of foreign compositions
Cantopop was born in the 1970s and became a cultural product with the popularity of two popular TVB drama's themes songs in the early 1970s: "Tower Ballad" (鐵塔凌雲, 1972) and "A marriage of Laughter and Tears" (啼笑因緣, 1974). The majority of "hit" Cantopop, however, is not entirely local produced but the cover versions of "hit" foreign melodies. Since the 1970s, covering "hit" external songs mainly from Japan, Korea, Taiwan or other Western countries became a common practice among Hong Kong record companies. At that time, Hong Kong's constantly growing music industry acknowledges simply by using those hits, whose already gained popularity, will be the easiest way to reach success in the market.  Cover versions were also widely used as a solution to address the shortage of the local hits due to the lack of local composers. Another reason for the use of cover versions is to minimise the production costs. The practice is also done for business reasons of filling up albums and re-capitalizing on songs with a proven record.

The Radio Television Hong Kong (RTHK) Top Ten Chinese Gold Songs Awards, which is one of the major music awards in Hong Kong since 1979, can reflect the great reliance on Japanese melodies in Cantopop.  During the 1980s, 139 out of 477 songs from weekly gold songs chart were cover versions, and 52% of the cover versions were covers of Japanese songs. Numerous legendary songs of Cantopop superstars Alan Tam, Leslie Cheung and Anita Mui, for example "Craziness" (1983), "Monica" (1984), "Foggy Love" (1984), "For Your Love Only" (1985), "Evil Girl" (1985), "The Past Love" (1986), "The First Tear" (1986), and "Fired Tango", were cover versions of Japanese hits, showing that covers contributed to the success of superstars to a certain degree.

By definition hybrids are still considered Cantonese songs due to the Cantonese lyrics, though the rights borrowed varies country to country.  Songs like "Tomorrow sounds like today" by Jenny Tseng, "Life to seek" by Danny Chan, "Snowing" by Priscilla Chan, and "Can't afford" by Jade Kwan were originally composed outside of Hong Kong. Many critics disapprove of the practice of covering foreign music and consider it lacking in originality, and many albums promoted themselves as "cover-free".

Canto-jazz 
January 29, 2010, Jacky Cheung released his Private Corner album coining the phrase "Canto-jazz", to describe the concept of the album and the musical style of the songs.

In The South China Morning Post, Rachel Mok described "Canto-jazz" as a "unique fusion of the two music styles" of "light jazz" and canto-pop creating a fresh sound with a uniquely local flavour".  She cited Jacky Cheung's Private Corner and Karen Mok's "Somewhere I Belong" among artists who have recorded Cantonese language albums in the new jazz genre coined "canto-jazz".

An educational study traced the development of jazz in Greater China and explored the cross-cultural issues in rearranging a cantopop song for big band or jazz combo arrangement.

Industry

Cantopop stars
Talent is unusually secondary to the success of a Cantopop singer in Hong Kong. Most times, image sells albums, as it is one of the characteristics of mainstream music similarly mirrored in the United States and Japan. Publicity is vital to an idol's career, as one piece of news could make or break a future.  Almost all modern Cantopop stars go into the movie business regardless of their ability to act; however, the reverse may also occur with actors releasing albums and embarking on concerts regardless of singing talent. They immediately expand to the Mandarin market once their fame is established, hence pure Cantopop stars are almost nonexistent. Outside of music sales, their success can also be gauged by their income. For example, according to some reports, Sammi Cheng earned HK$46M (around US$6M) from advertisement and merchandise endorsements in one month alone. Many artists, however, begin with financial hardships.  For example, Yumiko Cheng owed her company thousands of dollars.  Others include Elanne Kong crying in public with only HK$58 left.

Labels
PolyGram, EMI, Sony, Warner and BMG were established in Hong Kong since the 1970s. Local record companies such as Crown Records, Wing Hang Records, Manchi Records and Capital Artists in the past have become successful local labels. As TV drama themes lost favour in the mid-1980s, market power soon drifted to the multi-national labels. Sales are tracked at the IFPI HK Annual Sales Chart.

Major awards

A record chart which includes all genres of C-pop is the Global Chinese Pop Chart.

Cantopop radio stations

See also

 Music of Hong Kong
 Hong Kong musical tongue twister
 Hong Kong English pop
 Hong Kong television drama
 C-pop
 Hokkien pop
 Mandopop
 Chinese hip hop
 Taiwanese hip hop
 J-pop
 K-pop
 V-pop

References

External links
 C-Pop Fantasie – Online resource for c-pop, providing lyrics, downloads, video shows, and more.
 Pop Saves Hong Kong, in Tofu Magazine #2
 Hong Kong Vintage Pop Radio 
 www.hkmusic.cn: Cantopop song listings (in Chinese)
 www.mysongspage.com, lyrics and chords for Cantonese, English & Mandarin songs.
 香港50–80年代粵語流行曲唱片目錄 Disc index
 Come back to love blog
 Lee HC's 黑膠樂園 Disc index
 香港樂壇25年的發展 article
 [音乐评论][粤语流行四十年]

 
Cantonese
Cantonese-language songs
Pop music genres
Fusion music genres
Hong Kong music
C-pop
Chinese music